The commune of Vyanda is a commune of Bururi Province in south-western Burundi. The capital lies at Vyanda.
It contains the Vyanda Forest Nature Reserve.

References

Communes of Burundi
Bururi Province